The Atlas car was built in Springfield, Massachusetts from 1907-1911 (and became the Atlas-Knight for 1912–1913).

After Harry Knox left the company that had been building Knox cars in Springfield, he established the Knox Motor Truck Company in 1905 to produce Atlas commercial vehicles.  His former partners at his previous firm took him to court over the name.  After he was forbidden from using the Knox name, he formed the Atlas Motor Car Company in late 1907.

History
Harry Knox had proposed to the people producing the Sunset Automobile Company  in San Francisco, California that he produce the car under license.  At first they refused, but changed their mind after the 1906 San Francisco earthquake. The factory location was listed at 1336 Mission Street and manufactured cars by sourcing different components from various companies and selling a steam powered runabout for USD$900 ($ in  dollars ). By 1904 the main office moved to 1814 Market Street and the company switched to gasoline powered products using a twin-cylinder, two stroke engine installed in the front driving the rear wheels, and offered a runabout on a 84" wheelbase until 1905. When the factory was destroyed during the earthquake, Knox' offer to build a car with the help of Bert Knapp of the Knapp Manufacturing Company and combined with Sunset Automobile to form Victory Motor Car Company and relocated to 896 South First Street in San Jose and was open for business August 1906. Three body styles were offered and the company was producing eight cars a month. Due to internal legal matters involving theft from a customers car being repaired at the facility, and a lawsuit, the company was sold in 1912 and ended operations.

The Atlas of Springfield was thus based on the Sunset, even using the same two-stroke engine.  This same 2-cylinder 22 hp engine was used in the Atlas delivery vans and taxicab, starting in 1908.  Harry Knox refined the engine and developed a 3-cylinder 34 hp version of it.  Later, a 60 hp 4-cylinder version was offered.  The firm entered an Atlas in the 1909 Vanderbilt Cup, being the first two-stroke car to enter a major long-distance road race.  This fact was promoted in subsequent promotional materials.  Not long after, the two-stroke engine fell out of favor in the marketplace, and Knox added a Knight sleeve-valved engine in 1912.  These cars were called Atlas-Knights, and were bigger, five- or seven-passenger touring cars that cost approximately $3500 ($ in  dollars ). The company was bankrupt by early 1913, supposedly due to problems acquiring engines.  Harry Knox then moved to Indianapolis to assist the Lyons brothers in producing the Lyons-Knight.

Notes

References
G.N. Georgano, Nick (Ed.). The Beaulieu Encyclopedia of the Automobile. Chicago: Fitzroy Dearborn, 2000.

External links
1910 Atlas (Springfield-built) 60 HP Model H 7-pass. Touring Car at conceptcarz

Defunct motor vehicle manufacturers of the United States
Motor vehicle manufacturers based in Massachusetts
Cars powered by Knight engines